Robert Budzynski is a former professional French association footballer born in Calonne-Ricouart of Polish origin, who played as a defender, notably for France at FIFA World Cup 1966.

References

External links
 French Profile, stats and pictures
 French Profile, stats and pictures

1940 births
Living people
French footballers
France international footballers
RC Lens players
FC Nantes players
Ligue 1 players
1966 FIFA World Cup players
French people of Polish descent
Association football defenders